Plectania rhytidia is a species of fungus in the family Sarcosomataceae. Originally described under the name Peziza rhytidia by Miles Joseph Berkeley in 1855, the species was transferred to Plectania by mycologists John Axel Nannfeldt and Richard Korf in 1957.

References

External links

Pezizales
Fungi described in 1855
Fungi of Australia
Fungi of Europe
Fungi of New Zealand
Taxa named by Miles Joseph Berkeley